Moïse Kandé (born 1 August 1978) is a former professional footballer who played as a centre-back. Born in Senegal, he was a member, as a naturalized citizen, of the Mauritania national team.

References

External links 

1978 births
Living people
Footballers from Dakar
Senegalese footballers
Association football central defenders
FC Les Lilas players
Clermont Foot players
Olympique Noisy-le-Sec players
Nîmes Olympique players
US Orléans players
AEL Limassol players
PAEEK players
Cypriot First Division players
Cypriot Second Division players
Senegalese expatriate footballers
Senegalese expatriate sportspeople in France
Expatriate footballers in France
Senegalese expatriate sportspeople in Cyprus
Expatriate footballers in Cyprus
Naturalized citizens of Mauritania
Mauritania international footballers
Mauritanian footballers